
Gmina Pieszyce is an urban-rural gmina (administrative district) in Dzierżoniów County, Lower Silesian Voivodeship, in south-western Poland. Its seat is the town of Pieszyce. The gmina was created in 2016 as previously it was an urban gmina, by giving a village status to four parts of Pieszyce town.

Villages
Apart from the town of Pieszyce, Gmina Pieszyce contains the villages and settlements of Bratoszów, Kamionki, Piskorzów and Rościszów.

Neighbouring gminas
Gmina Pieszyce is bordered by the towns of Bielawa and Dzierżoniów and gminas of Świdnica, Dzierżoniów, Walim and Nowa Ruda.

Twin towns – sister cities

Gmina Pieszyce is twinned with:
 Schortens, Germany
 Świecie, Poland

References

Pieszyce
Dzierżoniów County